The Prompter is a 1999 Norwegian film directed by Hilde Heier. It was Norway's official Best Foreign Language Film submission at the 72nd Academy Awards, but did not manage to receive a nomination.

References

External links

1990s Norwegian-language films
1999 films
1999 comedy-drama films
Norwegian comedy-drama films